Jersey Jack Pinball, Inc. is an American company manufacturing pinball machines, which was established in 2011. The first table released by the company, The Wizard of Oz, was released in 2013.

History
Jersey Jack Pinball was founded in January 2011 by industry veteran Jack Guarnieri. Starting in 1975, he had serviced electromechanical pinball tables for a living, and he created the website PinballSales.com in 1999.

In 2020, Jersey Jack relocated their manufacturing operations from their original location in Lakewood, New Jersey to Elk Grove Village, Illinois.      

Jersey Jack's machines have been used in donations by Project Pinball Charity.

Games

References

External links
 
The latest information about Jersey Jack Pinball at pingamejournal.com

2011 establishments in New Jersey
Companies established in 2011
Pinball manufacturers
Manufacturing companies established in 2011